The 1960 NCAA College Division football rankings are from the United Press International poll of College Division head coaches. The 1960 NCAA College Division football season was the third year UPI published a Coaches Poll in what was termed the "Small College" division. 1960 was also the first year for the Associated Press version of the Small College poll. The teams were picked by an AP board of experts, made up of one person in each of the eight NCAA districts. In most cases the season-to-date Win/Loss records for each team were not published in either the AP or UPI polls.

Legend

The AP poll

The UPI Coaches poll

References

Rankings
NCAA College Division football rankings